The Breda Ba.64 was an Italian single-engine ground-attack aircraft used by the Regia Aeronautica during the 1930s.

Designed by Antonio Parano and Giuseppe Panzeri, it saw limited service in two units from 1936, together with the contemporary Caproni A.P.1. It was retired from active service in 1939, replaced by the more powerful derivative, the Ba.65.

Design and development

A development of the earlier Ba.27 fighter (1932), the Ba.64 was designed in 1933 to requirements set out by the Regia Aeronautica for an aircraft able to undertake multiple roles: fighter, bomber and reconnaissance. The aircraft featured an all-metal, low-wing cantilever monoplane with a wire braced tail unit and fixed tail wheel. The open cockpit was placed well forward on the fuselage in line with the wing roots to provide an excellent field of vision down as well as forward. The headrest behind the cockpit was extended as a streamlined fairing all the way down the fuselage upper decking to the tail. Two prototypes powered by a 522 kW (700 hp) Bristol Pegasus were developed, the first as a two-seater bomber with an armament of four 7.7 mm (0.303 in) machine guns in the wings and up to 400 kg (882 lb) of bombs in racks under the wings. The second was a single-seater fighter configuration fitted with a semi-retractable main landing gear that when in its rearward retracted position, provided less drag as well as protection in case of a wheels-up landing.

The first prototype flew in 1934 but flight tests revealed a lacklustre performance despite the use of a variable-pitch, three-blade propeller. Nonetheless, a limited production order was placed for a composite variant that combined the two-place configuration of the bomber (although a small number of single-seaters were built in the initial series) with the semi-retractable fighter landing gear. The production variant was powered by a 485 kW (650 hp) Alfa Romeo 125C and although single-seat variants were built, all the Ba.64s were converted to two-place bomber/attack aircraft with a single 7.7 mm (0.303 in) machine gun mounted in the rear cockpit. Production of the 42 Ba.64s was complete by 1936.

Operational history
Production aircraft were sent to 5° and 50° Stormos but pilots considered them ill-equipped to undertake missions as a bomber or fighter. The faults including being underpowered, heavy handling characteristics and a tendency to enter high-speed stalls that led to a number of fatal crashes. After limited use in front-line service, the Ba.64s were relegated to second-line duties although a small number survived until March 1943.

Two Ba.64s were exported by the Soviet Union in 1938 while a single example saw brief service in June 1937 during the Spanish Civil War with Nationalist forces in the Aviazione Legionaria.

Operators

Specifications (Ba.64)

See also

References

 Mondey, David The Hamlyn Concise Guide to Axis Aircraft of World War II. New York: Bounty Books, 2006. .
 Taylor, Michael J.H. Jane's Encyclopedia of Aviation Vol.2 . Danbury, Connecticut: Grolier Educational Corporation, 1980. .
 Winchester, Jim. "Breda Ba.65." Aircraft of World War II: The Aviation Factfile. Kent, UK: Grange Books plc, 2004. .

External links

 Breda Ba.64

Ba.064
1930s Italian attack aircraft
World War II Italian bombers
Single-engined tractor aircraft
Low-wing aircraft
Aircraft first flown in 1934